International Championship Wrestling was an independent professional wrestling promotion based in Lexington, Kentucky that operated from 1978 until 1984. It was run by Angelo Poffo, the father of Randy Savage and "The Genius" Lanny Poffo. Throughout its history, ICW was considered an "outlaw" promotion, as it was not a member of the National Wrestling Alliance and promoted shows in direct competition against NWA regional territories.

History
The promotion was founded in 1978 as a rival to Ron Fuller's Southeastern Championship Wrestling and Nick Gulas NWA Mid-American territory, extending into Verne Gagne's American Wrestling Association and Dick Afflis' World Wrestling Association territories by 1981. Later on they'd come in direct competition with Jerry Lawler and Jerry Jarrett's Continental Wrestling Association as well, operating in their territories and even managed to get several wrestlers to leave Southeastern and the CWA to join ICW. This, among other issues, would result in a series of lawsuits between Poffo and other NWA-affiliated organizations during the late 1970s and early 80s.

The main stars of ICW were Poffo's sons Randy (better known as "Macho Man" Randy Savage) and Lanny (better known as "Leaping" Lanny Poffo) who frequently traded the promotion's heavyweight title between each other; in fact only two other men (Ronnie Garvin and Paul Christy) held the ICW Heavyweight Championship in the 6 years the title existed. While Randy and Lanny were the focus of the federation, it did feature many other stars such as The Original Sheik (Ed Farhat), Ronnie Garvin, Crusher Broomfield (later known as One Man Gang and Akeem), Bob Orton, Jr., Bob Roop, Rip Rogers, "Pistol" Pez Whatley, Ox Baker, George Weingeroff, and the Devil's Duo (Jeff Sword and Doug Vines) with their manager Izzy Slapawitz.

Elizabeth Hulette, who would later gain fame in the WWF and WCW as Miss Elizabeth, got her start in professional wrestling as an on-camera host (using the name "Liz Hulette", as she was known to her friends while growing up) of ICW's weekly TV show where she also started her romance with Randy Savage.  They were later married.

In 1984 the promotion closed down due to dwindling attendance and its assets were bought by Jerry Jarrett and Jerry Lawler. Due to the fans' knowledge of the extremely bitter rivalry between ICW and CWA, Randy Savage was able to migrate to the CWA and begin a memorable feud with Jerry Lawler that established Randy Savage as a world-class superstar.

Same name, different promotions
Paul Christy, the wrestler who had ended Randy Savage's final reign as ICW World Champion, started a new ICW when Poffo's promotion folded. He ran the promotion for a few years with little publicity or success before closing it down in the late 1980s.

Another promotion called International Championship Wrestling operated out of Boston in the late 1980s, promoted by Angelo and Mario Savoldi, and Mario's son Joe Savoldi. After forming a working agreement with World Class Championship Wrestling, the Boston-based ICW was renamed International World Class Championship Wrestling (IWCCW). It included such stars as: The Russian Brute, Tom Brandi, Mike Kahula, Tony Rumble, and Nikolai Volkoff.

International Championship Wrestling (ICW) is also a lesser known promotion based in Cloverdale, BC. Past wrestlers include Buddy Wayne, and Chico Alvarez.

Tournaments
International Championship Wrestling held a variety of professional wrestling tournaments between 1980 and 1982 that were competed for by wrestlers that were a part of their roster.

ICW Television Championship Tournament (1980)
The ICW Television Championship Tournament was a single-elimination tournament to crown the first-ever ICW Television Champion. It was held in the fall, with the finals occurring on September 9, 1980.

ICW U.S Tag Team Championship Tournament (1982)
The ICW U.S. Tag Team Championship Tournament was a one-night tag team tournament held in Johnson City, Tennessee on January 5, 1982, for the vacant ICW United States Tag Team Championship.

Championships

Alumni

Wrestlers

Appolo Gold
Barry O
Bob Orton, Jr.
Bob Roop (Also worked as "The Best")
Boris Malenko
Buddy Landel
Chief Tapu
Crusher Broomfield
Doug Vines
Ernie Ladd
Gary Royal
George Weingeroff
The Great Kabuki
The Great Tio
Izzy Slapawitz
Jeff Sword
Lanny Poffo
MAX THUNDER
Mike Doggendorf
Mr. Wrestling I
The Miser
Ox Baker
Paul Christy
Pez Whatley
Randy Savage
Ratamyus
"Hustler" Rip Rogers
Ron "The One Man Gang" Garvin
Ron Wright
Super Duper Mario
The Sheik
Tojo Yamamoto
Tony Falk
Tony Peters
Willie Monroe
Jeff Turner Dr. X
Sam Diamond (Spiderman)
Bill Martin (1981 rookie of the year)
Rick Conner
Don Wright
Hoot Gibson
Devay Brunson
Terry Gibbs
Dennis Condrey
Chief Black Eagle
Masked Assassin
Big Boy Williams
Johnny Wilhoit
Terry Harris
 Pamela Watson
Julia "BlackWidow" Hoskins
Sidney Bakabella

Tag teams
The Batten Twins – (Brad Batten and Bart Batten)
The Convertible Blondes - (Pez Whatley, Rip Rogers and Gary Royal)
Devil's Duo – (Doug Vines and Jeff Sword)
The Samoans - (The Great Tio and Chief Tapu)

Announcers
 Tim Tyler
 Edgar Wallace
Liz Hulette
Robert Phillips Jr. (timekeeper)

Referees
Sam Diamond aka Jack Barnett
Jim Davis
Emmitt Couch
George Hill

See also

List of independent wrestling promotions in the United States

References

External links
 ICW Poffo Universe
 ICW (Poffo) history at KayfabeMemories.com
 Profile at OWW

1978 establishments in the United States
1984 disestablishments in the United States
Independent professional wrestling promotions based in the Southern United States
Professional wrestling in Kentucky